United Netherlands may refer to:

In history
 Seventeen Provinces (1482–1581), a precursor state to the three modern states of the Netherlands, Belgium and Luxembourg
 Republic of the Seven United Netherlands or Dutch Republic, (1581–1795), a precursor state of the Netherlands
 Sovereign Principality of the United Netherlands (1813–1815), a precursor state of the United Kingdom of the Netherlands (its territory corresponded roughly to that of the Netherlands)
 United Kingdom of the Netherlands (1815–1839), a precursor state of the Netherlands, Belgium, and Luxembourg

Other uses
 United Netherlands (organization), a Dutch student organization